She Still Comes Around (To Love What's Left of Me) is the ninth  album by Jerry Lee Lewis.  It was released on Smash Records in 1969.

Background
After leaving Sun Records for Smash in 1963, Lewis had scored only a few minor hits and, unhappy with the label's lack of enthusiasm for his recordings, appeared content to wait out the remainder of his contract.  However, the surprise success of Another Place, Another Time and She Still Comes Around (To Love What's Left Of Me) sparked new interest in the rock and roll legend, something he was quick to capitalize on after a decade in the commercial wilderness.  As country music historian Colin Escott recounts in his essay for the 1986 Bear Family retrospective The Killer: The Smash/Mercury Years, "Jerry was holding the trump card; his third straight country hit 'She Still Comes Around,' was rapidly climbing the best sellers charts...Jerry was to receive a basic royalty rate of 7% of the suggested list price of all singles, tapes and albums.  A far cry from the exorbitant 15% that some of the British superstars were getting at the same time but a damn sight better than the 3-5% that Sam Phillips liked to pay."  Lewis agreed to deliver at least three albums a year and would receive $13,000 as an advance after each album was completed. Lewis also assumed greater artistic control of the song selections and managed to secure a record deal for his sister, aspiring singer Linda Gail Lewis.

Recording
She Still Comes Around closely follows the same formula as Another Place, Another Time had from the year before: "hardcore" country arrangements performed in a no-nonsense fashion by Lewis and the top studio musicians in Nashville. Lewis interprets the songs with authenticity; in his 2014 authorized biography Jerry Lee Lewis: His Own Story, Rick Bragg states that these new songs were "simple ballads about losing, wanting, and walking on. Jerry Lee sang of shared misery, of a familiar pain, and knowing they were not alone made it easier, somehow, for his audience to get up the next morning, go back out in the world and do it all over again." Produced by Jerry Kennedy, the album is another confident blend of honky-tonk and tear-in-your-beer ballads, the foremost being the Glenn Sutton title track, which peaked at number 2 on the country singles chart. This was followed with "To Make Love Sweeter For You," which topped the charts in 1969 (his first number 1 since "Great Balls Of Fire" in 1958). Suddenly, in a remarkable turnaround, Jerry Lee Lewis was the hottest country artist in the business. The album includes another Merle Haggard song (the ballad "Today I Started Loving You Again") as well as several country standards, including "Release Me" and the drinking lament "There Stands The Glass."  "Out Of My Mind" was composed by Lewis's longtime guitarist Kenny Lovelace. The album is also noteworthy for containing a rereading of his long-forgotten 1959 Sun single "Let's Talk About Us."

Producer Jerry Kennedy would be a crucial component of this second wave of success in the next decade, balancing Lewis's rock and roll instincts with the traditionally conservative country radio. In the 2009 book Jerry Lee Lewis: Lost and Found, Kennedy insists that "Jerry was one of the easiest people I ever worked with.  I've heard a lot of stories of how he butted head with other people, but we always got along great.  I didn't spend a lot of time socializing with him. He would come to town, come to my office, and we'd listen to songs, and then we'd go into the studio and record.  And then he would go home."

A famous bootleg of Lewis fan Keith Richards performing "She Still Comes Around (To Love What's Left Of Me)" is widely available.

Reception
She Still Comes Around rose to number 12 on the Billboard country album chart.  AllMusic calls it "a pure country record, made for late nights and smoky bars, and it's nearly as good as Another Place, containing the same consistent high quality of songs and performance." Even the album cover - an evocative photo of a despondent Lewis in a decrepit hotel room - was singled out for praise for bringing the title track to life.

Track listing

References

Jerry Lee Lewis albums
1969 albums
Albums produced by Jerry Kennedy
Smash Records albums